Keser are a Scottish band from Edinburgh and Glasgow, Scotland. Keser are signed to UK indie label Alex Tronic Records, and have released three albums to date, Esoteric Escape, Robo Ghost and Audeamus. The first two albums were recorded at the Alex Tronic Records studio, with label manager and record producer Paul Croan, who also releases music as artist Alex Tronic. Audeamus was recorded at Keser's studio in Glasgow, Hidden Channel.

When performing live, Keser lean towards an instrumental, heavy, and distorted approach but will also perform quieter ambient textures within their music. This musical dynamic draws comparisons to genres like shoegaze, rock music, metal and post rock. Their live set up involves electric guitar, bass, keyboards, drum machines, effects, and samplers.

Live highlights
Keser toured their debut album in Scandinavia with shows in Norway and Denmark during December 2006. Notable support shows since then include Christ., Ulrich Schnauss, The Phantom Band, Sleepy Sun, Amazing Baby and Thomas Truax.

A short headline UK tour took place in February 2010 after the release of Robo Ghost.

Festival appearances
UK festivals:
 Spectrum Festival, 2007
 Stu Fest, 2007
 Leith Festival, 2008
 Edinburgh Festival Fringe 2009
 RockNess Festival, 2009
 Edinburgh Festival Fringe 2010

International festivals:
 Reeperbahn Festival in Hamburg, Germany, 2007
 Sled Island Festival in Calgary, Alberta, Canada, 2009
 North by Northeast Festival in Toronto, Ontario, Canada, 2010

Notable radio sessions
Keser appeared live on Fresh Air FM Edinburgh during February and May 2007. Airplay for tracks from Esoteric Escape and Robo_Ghost also included BBC Radio Scotland, Xfm, Radio K in Minneapolis, United States, Static Airwaves, Canada and Leith FM, Edinburgh.

The Keser track "4_Cycles" was listed as one of the top 10 discoveries of 2007 for DJ Al Chivers of Leith FM (renamed 98.8_Castle_FM).

They performed live and were interviewed during a radio session on Tide/Phonanza 96,0 FM, Hamburg in 2007.

Discography
Studio albums
 Esoteric Escape (2006, Alex Tronic Records)
 Robo Ghost (2009, Alex Tronic Records)
 Audeamus (2012, Alex Tronic Records)

Singles
 "Moon House" (2012, Alex Tronic Records)

Compilations
 Alex Tronic Records, Volume 1 (2007; Featured track "Horus Lives")

Reviews
 Daily Record UK Review of Album Esoteric Escape
 Evil Sponge Review of Album Esoteric Escape
 Norman Records UK Review of Album Esoteric Escape 
 Glasswerk Review of Alex Tronic Records Vol 1
 Losingtoday Magazine (Italy)

Radio play 
 BBC Radio Scotland, Keser Tracklist
 Keser Live Session Tracklist, Fresh Air FM Radio (See 24-02-07)
 Radio K Minneapolis Play List September 2007
 Radio K Minneapolis Play List March 2008
 Radio K Minneapolis Play List April 2008
 Tide/Phonanza 96,0 FM Radio, Hamburg
 Static Airwaves, Radio Laurier - Ontario, Canada
 Leith FM
 Ottic FM, Germany
 WKNC, USA

References

External links
 
 Gig Record from Official website
 Label, Alex Tronic Records
 UK Distribution
 Worldwide Distribution
 

Scottish post-rock groups
Scottish electronic music groups